The United Arab Emirates is a federation of seven Emirates, with autonomous federal and local governments. An income tax decree has been enacted by each Emirate, but in practice, the enforcement of these decrees is restricted to foreign banks and oil companies.

The UAE government implemented value added tax (VAT) in the country from January 1, 2018 at a standard rate of 5%.

In January 2022, the UAE government announced the introduction of a federal corporate tax. The standard corporate tax rate will be 9% for businesses that have a net annual profit of or over AED 375,000 and a rate of 0% for businesses with net annual profits under AED 375,000. The announcement included a corporate tax rate of 15% for multinational companies with profits over 750 million Euros a year, which is in line with the Global minimum corporate tax rate agreement. Freezone businesses can get exempt from corporate tax as long as they do not do business with the UAE mainland and follow other UAE guidelines. The country aims to commence the implementation of the corporate tax regimen starting 01 June 2023. Mainland companies also have to pay a percentage of their revenue to a local company, depending on the areas they are in.  There are also sin taxes on alcohol, energy drinks, vapes, and cigarettes in the UAE.

History
A lot of the revenues have been generated from oil sales to other countries. UAE is looking to diversify from this source and other hydrocarbons and therefore introducing other forms of revenue such as VAT.

Registration criteria
A business must register for VAT if their taxable supplies and imports exceed the mandatory registration threshold of AED 375,000. Furthermore, a business may choose to register for VAT voluntarily if their supplies and imports are less than the mandatory registration threshold, but exceed the voluntary registration threshold of AED 187,500. Similarly, a business may register voluntarily if their expenses exceed the voluntary registration threshold.  This latter opportunity to register voluntarily is designed to enable start-up businesses with no turnover to register for VAT.

De-registration criteria
If the annual turnover in 12 consecutive months is less than the voluntary registration threshold of  AED 187,500, the company or person may apply for de-registration in 20 days.

Failing to submit de-registration application lead to the imposition of a fine of AED 10,000.

Zero-rated Items of VAT
VAT will be charged at 0% in respect of the following main categories of supplies:
 Exports of goods and services to outside the GCC;
 International transportation, and related supplies;
 Supplies of certain sea, air and land means of transportation (such as aircraft and ships);
 Certain investment grade precious metals (e.g. gold, silver, of 99% purity);
 Newly constructed residential properties, that are supplied for the first time within 3 years of their construction;
 Supply of certain education services, and supply of relevant goods and services;
 Supply of certain Healthcare services, and supply of relevant goods and services

Exemptions from VAT
The following categories of supplies will be exempt from VAT:
 The supply of some financial services (clarified in VAT legislation);
 Residential properties;
 Bare land; and 
 Local passenger transport

VAT audit 
According to the federal law, it's necessary for the FTA to conduct regular VAT audits to ascertain the compliance of various businesses to the tax laws. These audits are often conducted at the workplace or at the other place of business of the involved party, as per the selection of the FTA. The notice of a similar should be issued to the person/business by the FTA a minimum of 5 days before.

Below are the elaborated procedures of VAT audit:

The involved party/business/person can file their tax returns on the FTA portal as per the schedule.

The FTA authorities can check the returns and alternative details. There should not be a selected reason for the FTA to conduct an audit of a business/taxpayer. They will conduct it for any reason or whenever they are required.

A notice is going to be issued to the involved party, a minimum of 5 days before the regular audit date. It will contain details, like the audit schedule, place, concerned parties, reason (if something particular), etc.

The auditor/s and also the taxpayer can meet at the scheduled place at the scheduled time and the process can begin. The auditor might ask for business records, in original and/or copies, and take samples of products and alternative assets as obtainable at the place at the time.

Note: The audited party has the right to ask for the credentials, like professional identification cards, from the tax auditors so as to see their authority.

The tax audit is to be conducted during the official FTA operating hours, unless the Director-General decides to conduct the audit of a business outside regular hours, in an exceptional case.

The taxpayer or the other person subject to a tax audit, in conjunction with his legal representatives and tax agents, are advised to participate and help the auditors performing their task.

If something suspicious is found within the results of the audit which may impact the tax return, the authority might order a re-audit for more analysis.

The audited person has the right to ask for the notification copy and connected documents and be present throughout the auditing procedures that are conducted outside of the official places.

In March 2021, FTA said that influencers on social media in the UAE or any users using online promotional activities should register for VAT and pay taxes if the value of the services they provide is more than AED 375,000 in a 12-month period.

See also 
Salik, tolls in the UAE

References

External links
UAE corporate tax A comprehensive guide

Economy of the United Arab Emirates
Value added taxes